John James Hill (1853–1932), known as John J. Hill, was born in Leicester, England.  He was a stonemason and builder in Utah and Nevada in the United States.

He was a local builder in Tonopah, Nevada.

A couple of his works are listed on the U.S. National Register of Historic Places.

His works include:
Tonopah Public Library, completed 1906, at 171 Central in Tonopah, Nevada, NRHP-listed
Alfred and Rosy Skinner House, completed 1905, at 232 W. 800 S. in Orem, Utah, NRHP-listed

References

1853 births
1952 deaths
American stonemasons
People from Leicester
People from Tonopah, Nevada
British emigrants to the United States